The tiger reserves of India were set up in 1973 and are governed by Project Tiger, which is administrated by the National Tiger Conservation Authority. Until 2018, 50 protected areas have been designated tiger reserves. 
In 2022, 53rd tiger reserve in India was declared in Ranipur Wildlife Sanctuary, Uttar Pradesh, and the State's fourth tiger reserve.

India is home to 80 percent of tigers in the world. In 2006, India estimated that there were 1,411 tigers which increased to 1,706 in 2010, 2,226 in 2014 and 2,967 in 2018. The increase in population of tigers in India played a big role in driving up global populations as well; the number of wild tigers globally rose from 3,159 in 2010 to 3,890 in 2016 according to World Wildlife Fund and Global Tiger Forum.

Goal
State forestry departments operate  of declared reserves "to ensure maintenance of viable populations of the conservation dependent Bengal tigers in India". The tigers are maintained for their scientific, economic, aesthetic, cultural and ecological values and to preserve for all time areas of biological importance as a national heritage for the benefit, educational purposes."

Population assessment

By the year 2018, according to the National Tiger Conservation Authority, there were estimated only 2,967 tigers in existence in India. The 2010 National Tiger Assessment estimated the total population of tigers in India at 1,706.  As per Ministry of Environment and Forests, the tiger population in India stood at 2,226 in 2014 with an increase of 30.5% since the 2010 estimate. This exhaustive study indicated that better protected tiger source sites, especially tiger reserves, have maintained viable populations. However, the area occupied by tigers outside protected areas has decreased considerably. This demonstrates the need for corridors in order for tigers to move between source sites. The existing tiger reserves represent around one-third of India's high density forest area. More tigers were killed in the first quarter of 2016 than in the entire previous year. This significant revelation comes at a time when the tiger census numbers are disputed by the scientific community.

In 2010–11, the National Tiger Conservation Authority (NTCA) in partnership with the Wildlife Institute of India (WII) undertook an independent management effectiveness evaluation (MEE) of the 53 tiger reserves in the country. The reserves were categorized into four major categories. Madhya pradesh has the highest number of tigers(526) in the age group of 1.5 years with more than 408 big cats. Other states with significant populations include Karnataka (524), Uttarakhand (442),  Tamil Nadu (229), Maharashtra (190), Assam (167), Kerala (136) and Uttar Pradesh (117).

List of tiger reserves

 Note that Amangarh Tiger Reserve in Uttar Pradesh is a buffer zone of Jim Corbett National Park, and may not be regarded as a separate tiger reserve. It has a buffer zone of  but no core area of critical tiger habitat.

Future
In addition to existing reserves, the in-principle approval has been accorded by the National Tiger Conservation Authority for the creation of two new tiger reserves, namely Ratapani Tiger Reserve in Madhya Pradesh, Dibang Wildlife Sanctuary in Arunachal Pradesh and Kaimur Wildlife Sanctuary in Bihar. Final approval has been accorded to Kudremukh National Park to be declared as a tiger reserve. The State Governments have been advised to send proposals for declaring the following areas as tiger reserves: Suhelva Sanctuary in Uttar Pradesh, Mhadei Sanctuary in Goa, Dibang Wildlife Sanctuary in Arunachal Pradesh and Cauvery-MM Hills in Karnataka.

References

 
Wildlife conservation in India
Conservation-reliant species